Raphael von Bargen (born 22 March 1977) is a German TV, film and stage actor.

Training
Born in Hamburg), where he studied to abitur level, he was next educated in music and philosophy. He completed his acting studies at the Max Reinhardt Seminar in Vienna in 2002. During his course he took several roles, including Alma (directed by Paulus Manker) as well as being directed three times by Stephanie Mohr - in Angriffe auf Anne (in the Spielbar of the Vienna Volkstheater), as Gottschalk in Käthchen von Heilbronn (at the Stadttheater Klagenfurt) and as Puck in A Midsummer Night's Dream.

Career

Wiener Burgtheater

Theater in der Josefstadt

Film and TV

Awards and nominations 
 Nestroy-Theaterpreis 2002 – Nominierung in der Kategorie Bester Nachwuchs für seine Darstellung des Hippolytos in Phaidras Liebe am Wiener Volkstheater
 2008/09: Karl-Skraup-Preis für die Titelrolle in Peer Gynt am Wiener Volkstheater
 Nestroy-Theaterpreis 2011 – Nominierung in der Kategorie Beste Nebenrolle für seine Darstellung des Wächsters in Antigone am Wiener Volkstheater
 Nestroy-Theaterpreis 2012 – Nominierung in der Kategorie Bester Schauspieler für die Titelrolle in Woyzeck & The Tiger Lillies (Vereinigte Bühnen Wien in Kooperation mit dem MuseumsQuartier)
 Österreichischer Filmpreis 2017 – Nominierung als Bester männlicher Darsteller für Thank You for Bombing

Selected filmography 

 2002: Kommissar Rex – Wenn Kinder sterben wollen
 2004: Strafversetzt 
 2005: SOKO Kitzbühel – Schlittenfahrt in den Tod
 2005: Mutig in die neuen Zeiten – Im Reich der Reblaus 
 2006: Mutig in die neuen Zeiten – Nur keine Wellen
 2006: Mozart Werke Ges.m.b.H.
 2008: 
 2008: Der Winzerkönig – Erntezeit
 2008: Darum (Director: Harald Sicheritz) 
 2009: SOKO Kitzbühel – Abgeschrieben
 2009: Schnell ermittelt – Iris Litani
 2011: SOKO Donau – Der Trojaner
 2012: Grenzgänger (Director: Florian Flicker)
 2012: SOKO Kitzbühel – Entsorgt
 2013: Paul Kemp – Alles kein Problem – Die Hölle sind wir
 2013: Tatort – Zwischen den Fronten
 2013: Bad Fucking
 2014: Clara Immerwahr
 2015: Woman in Gold 
 2015: Thank You for Bombing
 2018: SOKO Donau – Fadenspiel
 2018: Universum History – Der Verrat des Kaisers
 2018: Glauben, Leben, Sterben
 2019: Die Toten von Salzburg – Mordwasser
 2019: Vienna Blood
 seit 2019: Die Toten vom Bodensee (TV series) 
 2019: Die Meerjungfrau
 2020: Fluch aus der Tiefe
 2020: Der Blutritt

References

External links 
 
  Raphael von Bargen - agent's profile
  Raphael von Bargen in the Online-Filmdatenbank

Living people
1977 births
Male actors from Hamburg
German male film actors
German male stage actors
German male television actors
21st-century German male actors